Luchini is a surname. Notable people with the surname include:

Fabrice Luchini (born 1951), French actor
Jamie Luchini (born 1994), American soccer player
Louis Luchini (born 1981), American politician

See also
"Luchini AKA This Is It", a 1997 song by Camp Lo
Luchino

Surnames of Italian origin